Ferry (also known as Clio) is an unincorporated community in Greene County, in the U.S. state of Ohio.

History
Ferry was originally called Clio. The area around Clio or Ferry was settled as early as 1796. A post office called Clio was established in 1849, and remained in operation until 1864. A post office called Ferry operated from 1892 until 1901.

References

Unincorporated communities in Greene County, Ohio
1796 establishments in the Northwest Territory
Unincorporated communities in Ohio